Lyttelton ( or ) is a port town on the north shore of Lyttelton Harbour / Whakaraupō, at the northwestern end of Banks Peninsula and close to Christchurch, on the eastern coast of the South Island of New Zealand. 

As a landing point for Christchurch-bound seafarers, Lyttelton has historically been regarded as the "Gateway to Canterbury" for colonial settlers. Until the 2020 coronavirus pandemic, the port has been a regular destination for cruise ships. It is the South Island's principal goods-transport terminal, handling 34% of exports and 61% of imports by value.

In 2009 Lyttelton was awarded Category I Historic Area status by the Historic Places Trust (NZHPT) defined as "an area of special or outstanding historical or cultural heritage significance or value", not long before much of the historic fabric was destroyed in the 2011 Christchurch earthquake.

Location 
Lyttelton is the largest settlement on Lyttelton Harbour / Whakaraupō, an inlet on the northwestern side of Banks Peninsula extending 18 km inland from the southern end of Pegasus Bay. The town is situated on the lower slopes of the Port Hills, which form the northern side of the harbour and effectively separate Lyttelton from the city of Christchurch. This steep-sided crater rim acts as a natural amphitheatre and a boundary to urban development.

A tunnel through the Port Hills provides direct road access to Christchurch, 12 km to the northwest. The town of Sumner, some 6 km to the northeast, is accessed via Evans Pass, this link was closed after the 2011 Christchurch earthquake and reopened on 29 March 2019. Another settlement at Governors Bay lies 10 km to the west and a frequent ferry service connects the suburb of Diamond Harbour on the southern shore of the harbour.

The uninhabited Ōtamahua / Quail Island sits in the upper harbour southwest of Lyttelton.

Settlement

James Cook recorded his sighting of Lyttelton Harbour / Whakaraupō in 1770 during the first voyage to New Zealand. The first ship recorded entering the harbour was the sealer "Pegasus" in 1809.

Aiming to establish a Church of England colony in New Zealand, the Canterbury Association was founded in 1848 and was led by George William Lyttelton (George Lyttelton, 4th Baron Lyttelton). The town was named after the Lyttelton family in 1858. The large amount of flat land on the other side of the Port Hill, suitable for farming and development, made it ideal as a port town for a colony.

Joseph Thomas, as the agent of the Canterbury Association and its chief surveyor, was in charge of preparing the settlement for the settlers. He initially placed the port town at Rapaki and the settlement's capital, Christchurch, at the head of the harbour at present-day Teddington. But none of these initial ideas proved feasible, as Rapaki was not available, as it had been promised to Maori as a reserve, and required reclamation at the head of the harbour for the capital was estimated as too expensive.

Early survey work in Lyttelton was done by Thomas and Charles Torlesse, but most of it until completion in September 1849 was done by Edward Jollie. In his diary, Jollie explains how the streets got their names:

The names of the streets of the three towns I surveyed were taken from Bishoprics and the way it was done was this; as soon as I completed the map I took it to Thomas who putting on his gold spectacles and opening his would read out a Bishop's name to hear if it sounded well. If I agreed with him that it did, I put the name to one of the streets requiring baptism.

Lyttelton being the first-born town got the best names for its streets, Sumner being next had the next best and Christchurch being the youngest had to be content with chiefly Irish and Colonial bishoprics as names for its streets. This accounts for, what to anyone not knowing the circumstances, appears strange, viz: that many of the best English Bishoprics are not represented [editorial note: not represented "in Christchurch"] while Irish and Colonial ones are.

In August 1849 it was officially proclaimed a port. Pilgrim's Rock shows the place where European settlers first set foot in the harbour. The present location of the rock is well inland from the sea, as much of Lyttelton's dockside has been reclaimed from the harbour waters in recent years.

In 1850, four ships (the Randolph, Cressy, Sir George Seymour, and Charlotte Jane) arrived in Lyttelton Harbour, carrying the first what was to be known as the 'Canterbury pilgrims'. The arrival of the four ships had swelled Lyttelton's population to around 1,100. Over the next three years, 3,549 settlers arrived in Lyttelton. Lyttelton was formerly called Port Cooper (after Daniel Cooper) and Port Victoria. It was the original settlement in the district (1850). The name Lyttelton was formalised by the governor in 1858 in honour of George William Lyttelton of the Canterbury Association, which had led the colonisation of the area.

19th and 20th century 

The Lyttelton Times was one of the principal newspapers of the Canterbury region for 80 years, published from 1851 until 1929, at which time it became the Christchurch Times, until publication ceased in 1935.

On 1 July 1862, the first telegraph transmission in New Zealand was made from Lyttelton Post Office.

On 1 January 1908, the Nimrod Expedition, headed by Ernest Shackleton to explore Antarctica left from the harbour here.

The Lyttelton Harbour Board was created in 1877 to be in charge of the harbour's management. It was dissolved in 1989 after the passing of the 1988 Port Companies Act, which forced it to split into two separate organisations, one commercial (the Lyttelton Port Company, currently owned by Christchurch City Holdings, the commercial arm of the city council) and one non-commercial. In 1996 the Lyttelton Port Company registered on the New Zealand Stock Exchange.

1870 Lyttelton Fire 
On 24 October 1870, a fire broke out in the Queen's Hotel on London Street and had soon engulfed the main centre of Lyttelton. Prisoners of the Lyttelton Gaol were let out from their cells to help combat the flames. Two thirds of Lyttelton had been destroyed, with 30 businesses in all having perished in the fire, along with many private homes.

Lyttelton Timeball Station 
The Lyttelton Timeball Station was erected in 1876 and started signalling Greenwich Mean Time to ships in the harbour that year. It was one of the world's five working timeball stations until it was destroyed by the June 2011 Christchurch earthquake. The castle-like building was located high on a ridge above the port with extensive views over the harbour.  The tower, but not the rest of the building, has been faithfully reconstructed and was once again in working order at the end of 2018.

2010–2011 earthquakes 

The 2010 Canterbury earthquake damaged some of Lyttelton's historic buildings, including the Timeball Station. There was some damage to the town's infrastructure, but the port facilities and tunnel quickly returned to operation. The overall quake damage was less significant than in Christchurch itself, due to the dampening effects of the solid rock that the town rests on and its moderate distance from the epicentre.

Some walls of the Timeball Station collapsed and there was extensive damage to residential and commercial property, leading to the demolition of a number of high-profile heritage buildings such as the Harbour Light Theatre and the Empire Hotel. Many other unreinforced masonry buildings were severely damaged.

Following the February earthquake it was suggested that the Timeball Station be dismantled for safety reasons. Bruce Chapman, chief executive of the New Zealand Historic Places Trust (NZHPT) said there was a possibility that it may be reconstructed. "If we can find a way to dismantle the Timeball Station that allows us to retain as much of the building's materials as possible, we will do so."
However, on Monday 13 June 2011 a further 6.3  aftershock brought down the tower and remaining walls while workmen were preparing to dismantle it.

Much of Lyttelton's architectural heritage was lost as a result of the earthquakes, as damage was deemed too extensive for reconstruction. By June 2011, six buildings in London Street in Lyttelton had been demolished, along with another four on Norwich Quay.
The town's oldest churches have collapsed, including Canterbury's oldest  stone church, the Holy Trinity.
Following the  demolition of Holy Trinity Church, St Saviour's Chapel was returned to Lyttelton to the site of Holy Trinity in 2013. The wooden St Saviour's Chapel had been relocated from West Lyttelton to Christchurch's Cathedral Grammar School in the 1970s. The Anglican church is now named St Saviour's at Holy Trinity.

Demographics 
Lyttelton is defined by Statistics New Zealand as a small urban area.

Lyttelton had a population of 2,982 at the 2018 New Zealand census, an increase of 216 people (7.8%) since the 2013 census, and a decrease of 9 people (−0.3%) since the 2006 census. There were 1,269 households. There were 1,464 males and 1,518 females, giving a sex ratio of 0.96 males per female. The median age was 44.8 years (compared with 37.4 years nationally), with 492 people (16.5%) aged under 15 years, 372 (12.5%) aged 15 to 29, 1,698 (56.9%) aged 30 to 64, and 420 (14.1%) aged 65 or older.

Ethnicities were 92.6% European/Pākehā, 10.1% Māori, 1.0% Pacific peoples, 3.2% Asian, and 2.0% other ethnicities (totals add to more than 100% since people could identify with multiple ethnicities).

The proportion of people born overseas was 26.3%, compared with 27.1% nationally.

Although some people objected to giving their religion, 66.1% had no religion, 22.1% were Christian, 0.3% were Hindu, 0.3% were Muslim, 1.1% were Buddhist and 3.1% had other religions.

Of those at least 15 years old, 888 (35.7%) people had a bachelor or higher degree, and 261 (10.5%) people had no formal qualifications. The median income was $39,200, compared with $31,800 nationally. The employment status of those at least 15 was that 1,353 (54.3%) people were employed full-time, 450 (18.1%) were part-time, and 69 (2.8%) were unemployed.

Governance 

On 19 November 2005, it was announced that 60% of the Banks Peninsula District ratepayers voted to amalgamate with the neighbouring Christchurch City Council, which took place on 6 March 2006. This resulted in the creation of a new Christchurch City Council seat for the new ward of Banks Peninsula, and the creation of two Community Boards, the Lyttelton/Mt Herbert Community Board encompassing Lyttelton, Rapaki, Governors Bay, Diamond Harbour and Port Levy, and the Akaroa/Wairewa Community Board, encompassing Akaroa, Little River, Birdlings Flat, and the settlements of the Eastern and Southern Bays of Banks Peninsula. The Akaroa/Wairewa Community Board was further divided into two subdivisions, namely the Akaroa subdivision, and the Wairewa subdivision.

Transport 

The town is linked to Christchurch by railway and road tunnels through the Port Hills. At 1.9 km long, the Lyttelton road tunnel (opened in 1964) was the country's longest road tunnel, until the Waterview Tunnel in Auckland opened in July 2017; and the railway tunnel of the Lyttelton Line section of the Main South Line, officially opened on 9 December 1867, is the country's oldest.

Lyttelton Port 

Lyttelton has long been the main port of the Canterbury / Christchurch area, having been opened in 1877 by the Lyttelton Harbour Board, later becoming the Lyttelton Port Company with the introduction of the Port Companies Act in 1988.

Between 1958 and 1967 the port saw such prosperity that Kaiapoi, on the coast north of Christchurch, briefly reopened its closed port facilities for a decade, to allow smaller ships to bypass the congested Lyttelton wharves.

In the 1970s the port was chosen as one of the main ports in the South Island to be dredged and upgraded for containerisation, with the container facility opening in 1977, the centenary of the initial opening.

Substantial quantities of South Island coal have been shipped from this port for the past 100 years. The port facilities have provided for LP gas and petrol for the past 50 years. In essence the port could be viewed (based on quantities of materials shipped in or out) as the primary port for energy shipments in the South Island.

Education
Lyttelton Primary School is a full primary school catering for years 1 to 8.

In popular culture 

Lyttelton was the location for most of the exterior scenes in Peter Jackson's 1996 horror movie The Frighteners. Paul Theroux described Lyttelton as having "pretty houses" but was frustrated by having to cycle over the Port Hills to get back to Christchurch as cycling through the Lyttelton tunnel is not permitted and told his wife "what an awful time I was having".

Notable people
 

Ben Brown (b. 1962), poet, memoirist and children's author
Aldous Harding (b. 1990), folk singer-songwriter
Eileen Savell (1883–1970), farmer and volunteer nurse

References

Sources

External links

 Lyttelton Harbour visitor information
 Lyttelton Community Portal 
 Lyttelton Port Company
 First issue of Lyttelton Times, 1851

 
Populated places in Canterbury, New Zealand
Port cities in New Zealand
Heritage New Zealand Category 1 historic places in Canterbury, New Zealand
1848 establishments in New Zealand